Diego Antonio González Morales (born 2 July 1995) is a Mexican professional footballer who plays for La Piedad.

References

1995 births
Living people
Association football midfielders
Cafetaleros de Chiapas footballers
Alacranes de Durango footballers
Ocelotes UNACH footballers
Ascenso MX players
Liga Premier de México players
Footballers from Jalisco
Mexican footballers